Aldo Adolfo Leiva (born 10 January 1963) is an Argentine politician and Falklands War veteran, currently serving as National Deputy elected in Chaco Province. A member of the Justicialist Party, Leiva was elected in 2019, and currently sits in the Frente de Todos parliamentary bloc. He previously served as intendente (mayor) of General José de San Martín, Chaco on two occasions, from 2009 to 2019, and from 2003 to 2008.

Early and personal life
Leiva was born on 1 October 1963 in General José de San Martín, Chaco Province. He did his military service (then mandatory) in the 4th Infantry Regiment of the Argentine Army, based in Monte Caseros, Corrientes. In 1982, when he was 19 years old, he was called upon to fight in the Falklands – Malvinas War. Leiva fought in the Battle of Two Sisters.

Leiva is married to Rosana Miner and has four children.

Political career
Following the war, from 1982 to 1983, Leiva was employed as an undersecretary of the Municipal Council of General José de San Martín. Later, from 1987 to 1988, he was a legislative aide at the Chamber of Deputies of the province. He was also Secretary of Public Works and Services of San Martín from 1989 to 1990. From 1997 to 2000, he was government secretary of Ciervo Petiso. Leiva has served as president of the Chaco Province Justicialist Party, and has been Secretary General of the party council since 2016.

In 2003, he was elected intendente (mayor) of his hometown of General José de San Martín. He was re-elected in 2007. In November 2008, he was appointed Minister of Social Development of Chaco Province by Governor Jorge Capitanich. He was removed from the post following poor showings in the province's social indexes in July 2009, and returned to his position as mayor of San Martín, as he had not resigned, but rather taken leave from the position. He was re-elected in 2011 and 2015.

At the 2019 legislative election, Leiva was the second candidate in the Frente Chaqueño list to the Chamber of Deputies. The list was the most voted with 56.70% of the vote, and Leiva was easily elected, alongside the first candidate in the list, Lucila Masin. Leiva was succeeded in the mayoralty of San Martín by his son, Mauro Leiva.

During his 2019–2023 term, Leiva formed part of the parliamentary commissions on Housing and Urban Planning, Finances, Industry, Public Works, and Transport. He was an opponent of the legalization of abortion in Argentina, voting against the 2020 Voluntary Interruption of Pregnancy bill that passed the Argentine Congress.

References

External links
Profile on the official website of the Chamber of Deputies (in Spanish)

Living people
1963 births
People from General José de San Martín, Chaco
Members of the Argentine Chamber of Deputies elected in Chaco
Justicialist Party politicians
Mayors of places in Argentina
Argentine military personnel of the Falklands War
21st-century Argentine politicians